Flare is the annual socio-cultural festival of the Pandit Deendayal Petroleum University. It is a four-day festival at PDPU featuring music and dance. It is held in April every year. It was started in 2010 and since then has attendance of over 9,000 students from various colleges of India.

Pro-nites
In its first year, there were performances by the Pakistani band Jal and several other bands like Antariksh based on popular band Pink Floyd. In its second year, Flare hosted performances by Agnee, Highway 61, and Jaipur Beats along with DJ Suketu.

Cultural events

 Ablaze- National-level group dance competition
 AtMoshSphere- Battle of bands 
 Amethyst- National-level model hunt
 Melodia- Music competition
 Emotions- Drama competition
 Zest- Solo and duet dance competition
 Kavyanjali- Poetry competition
 Literature events
 Cooking events 
 Fine arts events
 Flea market
 Guest lectures
 Special performances 
 Informals

References

Cultural festivals in India
College festivals in India